Hyperuatas or Hypervatas  was a general of the Achaean League in Ancient Greece who served only for a year, 226–225 BC.

It was under his nominal command, though the real direction of affairs was in the hands of Aratus of Sicyon, that the Achaeans met with the decisive defeat at Battle of Dyme near Hecatombaeon.

References

Ancient Greek generals
3rd-century BC Greek people
Achaean League